Garnet Health is a Middletown, New York-based three-campus health system which, together with its nine urgent-care facilities, "provides care to approximately 450,000 residents in Orange, Sullivan and Ulster counties" in New York State. The hospital's roots date back to 1887.

Background

Garnet Health

 is the current umbrella corporation and is the current brand for all three medical centers in Middletown (Garnet Health Medical Center), Harris (Garnet Health Medical Center - Catskills, Harris Campus), and Callicoon (Garnet Health Medical Center - Catskills, Callicoon Campus) plus nine urgent-care facilities, and physician practices under the brand name "Garnet Health Doctors".

Greater Hudson Valley Health System
 was an umbrella corporation formed from two medical centers, Orange Regional Medical Center  and Catskills Regional. Each was an affiliation of two hospitals. Orange (ORMC) has "rebranded" as Garnet Health Medical Center, and Catskills (CRMC) as the similarly named Garnet Health Medical Center Catskills.

Orange Regional Medical Center

Initially both hospital locations continued to operate under their new name. In 2009 Orange Regional began construction of a new facility, with the goal of having a single, more modern facility. It was ready in 2011, and the two earlier locations closed.

Construction had been done using a then-innovative cost-saving method named design-build; it also saved money and allowed adding more beds, with a total of 353 parient rooms. The hospital was formed as "a consolidation of Arden Hill Hospital in Goshen and Horton Medical Center in Middletown,"

Horton Medical Center

Horton Medical Center began with fundraising in 1887, with a facility named Thrall Hospital opening in 1892. A newer building, using the name Elizabeth A. Horton Memorial Hospital opened in 1929. New wings and additional structures were added in 1956, 1971, and 1980.

Arden Hill Hospital
Arden Hill Hospital originated with a 1908 fundraising effort under the name Goshen Hospital. After enhancements and relocations,it became Arden in 1967.  It closed in 2011, when the new Orange Regional facility became operational.

Catskills Regional Medical Center

Catskills Regional Medical Center included a hospital in Harris, New York and the smaller 25-bed facility in Callicoon. These were part of the previously named Greater Hudson Valley Health System, now named Garnet Health Medical Center - Catskills.  With the 2011 closing of Horton and
Arden, the main Garnet site and these two Catskills facilities comprise the medical center's three campuses.

Harris is a Federally-designated Primary stroke center.

References

  

Hospitals in New York (state)